The eponymous debut album of Claire Voyant was first released in 1995. In 1997 it was reissued on the German label Hyperium Records, and was re-released once more in 2000 under Accession Records.

Each release of the album features very different artwork.

Track listing
 "Heaven Knows" – 
 "Her" – 
 "Deep" – 
 "Someday" – 
 "Aqua" – 
 "Wanderlust" – 
 "Land and Sea" – 
 "Morning Comes" – 
 "Fear" –

Release history 

Claire Voyant (band) albums
1995 debut albums